Zatomus is an extinct genus of pseudosuchian from the Late Triassic. Fossil remains have been found in North Carolina, United States. It is classified as a rauisuchian, a type of large carnivorous thecodontian archosaur, and was once thought to be a dinosaur.

References

Prehistoric pseudosuchian genera
Prehistoric archosauriforms
Late Triassic archosaurs of North America
Taxa named by Edward Drinker Cope
Fossil taxa described in 1871